Juan Carlos Pablo Dyrzka (24 March 1941 in Buenos Aires – 26 June 2012) was an Argentine hurdler who competed in the 1964 Summer Olympics and in the 1968 Summer Olympics.

References

1941 births
2012 deaths
Athletes from Buenos Aires
Argentine male hurdlers
Argentine male sprinters
Olympic male hurdlers
Olympic male sprinters
Olympic athletes of Argentina
Athletes (track and field) at the 1964 Summer Olympics
Athletes (track and field) at the 1968 Summer Olympics
Pan American Games medalists in athletics (track and field)
Pan American Games gold medalists for Argentina
Athletes (track and field) at the 1963 Pan American Games
Athletes (track and field) at the 1967 Pan American Games
Athletes (track and field) at the 1971 Pan American Games
Japan Championships in Athletics winners
Medalists at the 1963 Pan American Games
20th-century Argentine people